Hadejia Stadium is a multi-use stadium in Hadejia, Jigawa State, Nigeria. It is currently used mostly for football matches and is the home stadium of Jigawa Golden Stars F.C. The stadium has a capacity of 15,000 people.

References

External links
Nigeria: Jigawa Govt Releases N25m to Jigawa Golden Stars

Football venues in Nigeria